Misa  is a genus of moths of the family Noctuidae. The genus was erected by Ferdinand Karsch in 1895.

Taxonomy
The Global Lepidoptera Names Index gives this name as a synonym of Schausia Karsch, 1895.

Species
 Misa cosmetica Karsch, 1898
 Misa costistrigata Bethune-Baker, 1927
 Misa memnonia Karsch, 1895
 Misa schultzei Aurivillius, 1925

References

Agaristinae